Killaloe/Bonnechere Airport , near Killaloe, Ontario, Canada, was built by the Canadian Department of Transportation (later Transport Canada) in 1952 as a Cold War airstrip for interceptors. The airport officially ceased operations in 1988, but trespassing is frequent: pilots continue to land on the old runway, and local residents frequently use it for drag racing, despite the badly decayed surface.

In 2004, because of legal liability concerns, Transport Canada planned to cut ditches across the runway to make it unusable, but the plan was suspended while negotiations on possible future use continued.

The associated VOR, YXI, was decommissioned in 2021 by Nav Canada.

External links
Historical recollections of the airport
Satellite photo of the former airport
Bonnechere / Killaloe Airport on COPA's Places to Fly airport directory

Defunct airports in Ontario